Henry Roland Totten (November 6, 1892 - February 9, 1974) was an American botanist.

Biography
Totten was born in North Carolina on November 6, 1892. He was the son of William Theophilus Totten of Rockingham County, North Carolina, minister, educator, and president of Yadkin Collegiate Institute (later Yadkin College) for twenty-six years.

Totten graduated from University of North Carolina at Chapel Hill in 1913 and completed his graduate work under William Chambers Coker. His academic career was spent as a faculty member of the Botany Department for fifty years, teaching general botany, dendrology, pharmacognosy, and plant taxonomy at the University of North Carolina at Chapel Hill. He assisted   Coker in the establishment of the Coker Arboretum in 1903.  The university completed the Totten Center, named for him,  in 1976 as the first permanent building in the North Carolina Botanical Garden.

Totten was a member of many scientific societies and the author of The Plant Life of Hartsville, S. C. (1912); The Trees of North Carolina (with William Coker) (1916). Besides these he contributed numerous articles on morphology and botany to scientific journals. A hybrid oak, Quercus x totteni, was named in his honor. A specimen currently grows near the front entrance to the Totten Center at the North Carolina Botanical Garden. He died on February 9, 1974.

References

Further materials are located in the Totten papers in the Southern Historical Collection, Manuscript Department, Wilson Library, and in the papers of the UNC Botany Department, University of North Carolina at Chapel Hill . 
A bibliography of Totten's theses and publications has been assembled by Rhonda Teague Rogers and emended by William R. Burk. The best published source of biographical information on Totten is a memorial piece which appeared in the Journal of the Elisha Mitchell Scientific Society, vol. 89, pp. 262–263. 
 Totten, H. R. (Henry Roland), 1892-1974 
 Totten, Henry Roland | NCpedia 
"Henry Roland Totten (1892-1974)." UNC-Biology, Herbarium.  Ibiblio. .
"A Nursery of Patriotism: The University at War." Exhibits, UNC Library. 
Coker, William Chambers, and H. R. Totten. 1916. The trees of North Carolina. Chapel Hill [N.C.]: W.C. Coker. .

1892 births
1974 deaths
20th-century American educators
American science writers
People from Caswell County, North Carolina
University of North Carolina alumni
American botanists